A Ballad Album, is an album by saxophonist Warne Marsh which was recorded in 1983 and released on the Dutch Criss Cross Jazz label.

Reception 

The Allmusic review states:

Track listing 
 "I Can't Give You Anything but Love, Baby" (Jimmy McHugh, Dorothy Fields) – 5:42 	
 "The Nearness of You" (Hoagy Carmichael, Ned Washington) – 7:57 	
 "How Deep Is the Ocean?" (Irving Berlin) – 5:49 
 "Spring Is Here" (Richard Rodgers, Lorenz Hart) – 5:10 	
 "How High the Moon" (Morgan Lewis, Nancy Hamilton) – 7:16
 "Time on My Hands" (Vincent Youmans , Harold Adamson, Mack Gordon) – 4:36
 "Emily" (Johnny Mandel, Johnny Mercer) – 5:03
 "My Romance" (Rogers, Hart) – 5:40
 "How Deep Is the Ocean?" [take 3] (Berlin) – 5:39 Bonus track on CD reissue 
 "Time on My Hands" [take 1] (Youmans, Adamson, Gordon) – 5:11 Bonus track on CD reissue 
 "The Nearness of You" [take 1] (Carmichael, Washington) – 7:30 Bonus track on CD reissue

Personnel 
Warne Marsh – tenor saxophone
Lou Levy – piano
Jesper Lundgaard – bass
James Martin – drums

References 

Warne Marsh albums
1984 albums
Criss Cross Jazz albums